Ramagrama stupa (also Ramgram, Rāmgrām, Rāmagrāma) is a stupa located in Ramgram Municipality, in the Parasi District of Nepal. This Buddhist pilgrimage site containing relics of Gautama Buddha was constructed between the Mauryan and Gupta periods, according to research by Nepal’s Department of Archaeology.

History

Gautama Buddha's parents were from two different mahājanapadās (kingdoms) of the Solar dynasty — his father (Śuddhodana) belonged to the Shakya kingdom, while his mother (Maya) was from the Koliya kingdom. According to Buddhist texts, after Buddha's Mahaparinirvana, his cremated remains were divided and distributed among the princes of eight of the sixteen mahājanapadās. Each of the princes constructed a stupa at or near his capital city, within which the respective portion of the ashes was enshrined. These eight stupas were located at:
Allakappa, a settlement of the Bulī people. The precise location of this place is not currently known.
Kapilavastu, capital city of the Shakya kingdom (the location of this stupa is the subject of some controversy; there is evidence it was actually constructed at Piprahwa)
Kusinārā, capital city of one of the two Malla republics
Pāvā, capital city of the other Malla republics
Rājagaha a major city of the Magadha kingdom
Rāmagrāma, a major city of the Koliya kingdom (this settlement is sometimes referred to as Koliyanagara)
Vesāli, capital city of the Vajjika League
Veṭhadīpa, a settlement of Veṭhadīpaka Brahmins. The precise location of this place is not currently known.

Some 300 years later, Emperor Ashoka opened seven of these stupas and removed the Buddha relics (his goal was to redistribute the relics into 84,000 stupas which he planned to construct throughout the Maurya Empire). According to legend, the serpent king was guarding the Ramagrama stupa, and prevented Ashoka from unearthing the relic, making it one of the eight undisturbed stupas.

Archaeological research
To this day, Ramagrama stupa remains the only intact and original stupa containing relics of Buddha. The stupa has been an object of great reverence and pilgrimage site since its original construction. The  stupa is now buried under a mound of earth and is awaiting further research. The dimensions of the stupa complex are 10m high and 23.5m in diameter. A geophysical survey revealed a perfect quadrangular Kushan monastery buried below the surface, whose dense concentration of brick prevented crops from growing, leading to the area being known as an "unlucky field".

World Heritage Status
This site was added to the World Heritage Tentative List by UNESCO on May 23, 1996 in the Cultural category.

Gallery

See also
Ayodhya
Dasharatha
Ikshvaku dynasty
Kshatriya
List of stupas in Nepal
Mahapadma Nanda

References

Further reading
The Accumulate Stupa of Ramagrama

External links
Ramgram Stupa, the Buddha relic stupa of Nepal
Ramgram Stupa ko Behal-Nawalparsi (video in Nepali language)

5th-century BC establishments in Nepal
Archaeological sites in Nepal
Buddhist pilgrimage sites in Nepal
Buddhist relics
Buildings and structures in Parasi District
Nāgas
Religious buildings and structures in Nepal
Stupas in Nepal